Andrew "Andy" Palmer, also known as N. A. Palmer, is a British musician and artist. He was the rhythm guitarist for anarcho punk band Crass.

Crass 
Palmer joined the band in 1977 and plays on all their albums and singles. He played his guitar in an unusual way: his left hand would be sliding over the fretboard while he strummed the strings with his right thumb, using the instrument to produce 'drone' or percussive sounds. He hardly ever played conventional chords and never a solo.

Palmer was also responsible for the artwork for some of the albums released by Crass Records, such as The Eye by Kukl and The Fucking Cunts Treat Us Like Pricks by Flux Of Pink Indians. He left Crass in July 1984, after a concert in Aberdare, Wales. This catalysed the affirmation of Crass' consistently stated intention to split up in 1984, and the band stopped performing and recording.

After Crass 
Palmer returned to his art college studies. Between 1985 and 1990, he studied at St. Martins School of Art and the Royal College of Art. His paintings are regularly exhibited. He collaborated with former Crass members as part of the 2002 'Voices In Opposition To War' event at the Queen Elizabeth Hall on London's South Bank, performing three songs with Eve Libertine and jazz guitarist Phil Robson. Apart from this he has chosen not to participate in, nor contribute to, any further Crass related activities or projects, including books and documentaries about the band.

Discography (with Crass)

LPs
The Feeding of the 5000 (LP, 1978, Small Wonder Records) [UK Indie -#1]
The Feeding of the 5000 - Second Sitting (LP, 1980, Reissue on Crass Records 621984, with the missing track "Asylum" reinstated) [UK Indie – #11]
Stations Of The Crass (521984, LP, 1979) [UK Indie – #1]
Penis Envy (321984/1, LP, 1981) [UK Indie – #1]
Christ - The Album (BOLLOX2U2, double LP, 1982) [UK Indie – #1]
Yes Sir, I Will (121984/2, LP, 1983) [UK Indie – #1]
Best Before 1984 (CATNO5, LP compilation, 1986) [UK Indie – #7]

Singles
"Reality Asylum / Shaved Women" (CRASS1, 7", 1979) [UK Indie – #9]
"You Can Be You" (521984/1, 7" single by Honey Bane, backed by Crass under the name Donna and the Kebabs, 1979) [UK Indie – #3]
"Bloody Revolutions / Persons Unknown" (421984/1, 7" single, joint released with the Poison Girls, 1980) [UK Indie – #1]
"Tribal Rival Rebel Revels" (421984/6F, flexi disc single given away with Toxic Grafity (sic) fanzine, 1980)
"Nagasaki Nightmare / Big A Little A" (421984/5, 7" single, 1981) [UK Indie – #1]
"Sheep Farming In The Falklands / Gotcha" (121984/3, 7" single, 1982, originally released anonymously as a flexi-disc) [UK Indie – #1]
"How Does It Feel To Be The Mother Of 1000 Dead? / The Immortal Death" (221984/6, 7" single, 1983) [UK Indie – #1]
"Whodunnit?" (121984/4, 7" single, 1983), pressed in "shit coloured vinyl") [UK Indie – #2]
"You're Already Dead / Nagasaki is Yesterday's Dog-End / Don't get caught" (1984, 7" single, 1984)

Live recordings
Christ: The Bootleg (recorded live in Nottingham, 1984, released 1989 on Allied Records)
You'll Ruin It For Everyone (recorded live in Perth, Scotland, 1981, released 1993 on Pomona Records)

References 

1956 births
Living people
Anarcho-punk musicians
Crass members
English anarchists
English punk rock guitarists
Rhythm guitarists
English male guitarists